John Birdsall (1802 – July 22, 1839) was an American lawyer and politician from New York and Texas.

Born in the town of Greene in New York's Chenango County, he was the son of Maurice Birdsall (1774–1852) and Ann (Pixley) Birdsall (1778–1829). He married Ann Whiteside (1805–1833), and then Sarah Peacock (1816–1895).

He was admitted to the bar, and practiced in Mayville, New York.

He was Judge of the Eighth Circuit Court from 1826 to 1829.

He was a member of the New York State Assembly (Chautauqua Co.) in 1831.

He was a member of the New York State Senate (6th D.) from 1832 to 1834, sitting in the 55th, 56th and 57th New York State Legislatures. He resigned his seat on June 5, 1834.

In 1837, he removed to Houston, then the capital of the independent Republic of Texas, and resumed the practice of law there. The same year, he was appointed Attorney General of the Republic of Texas. In November 1838, he was appointed by President Sam Houston as Chief Justice of the Supreme Court of the Republic of Texas, to fill the vacancy caused by the death of James Collinsworth, but the Texas Congress did not confirm the appointment, and instead elected Thomas Jefferson Rusk a few days after Houston left the presidency.

Afterwards he resumed the practice of law in partnership with Houston, but died a few months later in Houston at the age of 37 and was buried at the city's Glendale Cemetery.

Neither Collinsworth nor Birdsall ever convened the Supreme Court, the first session was held in January 1840, six months after Birdsall's death, with Rusk as chief justice.

New York State Treasurer Alvah Hunt was Birdsall's brother-in-law.

References 
The New York Civil List compiled by Franklin Benjamin Hough (pages 129f, 138, 210, 259 and 356; Weed, Parsons and Co., 1858)
Texas in 1837 ed. by Andrew Forest Muir (1958; pg. 216)
Handbook of Texas Online - John Birdsall

1802 births
1839 deaths
People from Greene, New York
People from Mayville, New York
Politicians from Houston
New York (state) state senators
Members of the New York State Assembly
Anti-Masonic Party politicians from New York (state)
19th-century American politicians
New York (state) state court judges
Texas Attorneys General
Chief Justices of the Republic of Texas Supreme Court
19th-century American judges